Manasota may refer to:

Places
Manasota, Florida, a community in Sarasota County, Florida
Manasota Key, Florida, a census-designated place in Charlotte County, Florida
Manasota Scrub Preserve, an area of protected land in Sarasota County, Florida

Other uses
Manasota culture, an archaeological culture of southwestern Florida
Manasota Key Offshore, an underwater archaeological site in the Gulf of Mexico